Megachile bispinosa is a species of bee in the family Megachilidae. It was described by Friese in 1921.

References

Bispinosa
Insects described in 1921